KFEB (107.5 FM, "The Pulse 107.5 Hits Now") is a radio station broadcasting a pop contemporary hit radio music format. Licensed to Campbell, Missouri, United States, the station is currently owned by Eagle Bluff Enterprises and features programming from Westwood One.

History
The Federal Communications Commission issued a construction permit for the station on May 14, 1997. The station was assigned the call sign KAVY on June 27, 1997, and on March 27, 1998, changed its call sign to the current KFEB. On April 14, 1999, the station received its license to cover. The station has been silent since January 27, 2009.

References

External links

FEB
Contemporary hit radio stations in the United States
Radio stations established in 1999
1999 establishments in Missouri